Travis Jeppesen is an American novelist, poet, artist, and art critic. He is known, among other works, for his novel The Suiciders; a non-fiction novel about North Korea, See You Again in Pyongyang; and for his object-oriented writing work, 16 Sculptures.

Work and career

Jeppesen's first novel, Victims, was selected by Dennis Cooper to debut his Little House on the Bowery series for Akashic Books in 2003; a Russian translation of the novel was published in 2005 by Eksmo. Written in a Southern Gothic vein, the novel is inspired in part by the UFO religious cult Heaven's Gate, which he researched extensively while working on the book. With its use of multiple narrators, dark absurdist comedy, and what Michael Miller, writing for the Village Voice, deemed its "schizophrenic logic" and "gleefully unique syntax," critics compared the novel's style to authors as diverse as William Faulkner, Kathy Acker, and Jean-Paul Sartre. 

Jeppesen followed Victims with a collection of poetry, Poems I Wrote While Watching TV. It was described by one critic as "synesthetic, kinetic poems hypersaturated with mass culture images, delivered in a tone that manages to sound simultaneously surreal and conversational." A second collection, Dicklung & Others, appeared in November 2009.

Jeppesen's second novel, Wolf at the Door (Twisted Spoon Press), was completed during a residency at the Slovene Writers' Association in Ljubljana, and appeared in 2007. The book consists of two separate plot lines that never intersect. One concerns an aging artist suffering from a terminal illness who has removed himself to a small cabin to live out his final days, his sole contact being with a deaf-mute gravedigger with whom he is unable to effectively communicate. The second story centers on the nocturnal wanderings of a former porn star, who may or may not be a serial killer, in an unnamed Eastern European city. With its morbid themes and graphic depictions of sexual violence, the novel alienated many readers. Others, such as the writer Noah Cicero, championed the novel for its originality, dark humor, and linguistic ingenuity.

Jeppesen's third novel, The Suiciders, is considered by many to be his wildest book, with "writing that can go almost anywhere at any time," in the words of Blake Butler, though it can also be considered as a 21st-century continuation of the grotesque body tradition of Gargantua and Pantagruel and Don Quixote. Subsequent to its publication, he performed “marathon readings” of the entire novel, lasting eight hours without pause, at the Institute of Contemporary Arts in London and the Whitney Museum of American Art in New York.

Jeppesen's critical writings on art, film, and literature have appeared in Artforum, Art in America, Texte zur Kunst, Flash Art, New York Press, Bookforum, The Stranger, and Zoo Magazine. He is the recipient of a 2013 Arts Writers Grant from Creative Capital/the Warhol Foundation. A collection of his art criticism, Disorientations, was published in 2008; subsequently, Jeppesen launched disorientations.com, a "one-man art magazine." As of 2020, Disorientations also includes links to Jeppesen's published art reviews and essays online, as well as miscellaneous poetry, fiction, and essays he has written, much of it previously only available in print form.

In October 2011, Jeppesen announced that he would be shifting the focus of the website to explore his notion of object-oriented writing, a new form of writing he invented in response to his feelings of frustration over traditional art criticism. Over the next few years, Jeppesen worked on the development of object-oriented writing as a hybrid creative-critical practice. In its proposition of a metaphysics of art writing, object-oriented writing could be thought of as a parallel creative practice to object-oriented ontology and speculative realism. It locates itself within the work of art, rather than outside, and attempts to infest the inanimate art object with human agency via the act of writing. In 16 Sculptures, Jeppesen re-created sixteen sculptures, from throughout the history of art, in the medium of language. The texts' style range from monologues, dialogues, rants, songs, poems, and epiphanies, among other, more hybrid or inventive forms, all of them evasive of the tropes of traditional art criticism. 16 Sculptures manifested in the form of a published book, but also an audio installation, in which visitors to the gallery sat in chairs and put on black glasses that blocked out their vision and listened to audio recordings—or "evocations"—of the texts on headphones. Early on in the project, Jeppesen also intended a limited edition vinyl release consisting of sixteen records, but to date this has not happened. In 2014, 16 Sculptures was featured in the Whitney Biennial and in a solo exhibition at Wilkinson Gallery in London. Excerpts from 16 Sculptures, translated into Mandarin, were recorded and featured in a group exhibition in Beijing.

Shortly thereafter, Jeppesen began exhibiting his calligraphic work on paper widely in exhibitions throughout Europe and Asia. While this work is presented in traditional art world contexts (galleries and museums), Jeppesen insists that these works are instances of writing "in the expanded field."

In addition to his object-oriented writing and calligraphic works, Jeppesen continued to write fiction. 2014 saw the publication of All Fall, which consisted of two novellas: "Written in the Sky," an invocation of a plane crashing in slow motion (that Jeppesen allegedly wrote on a red-eye flight from Beijing to Vienna in the fall of 2012); and "White Night," described as a "thoughtscape" of the philosopher Gilles Deleuze in the moments preceding his suicide on November 4, 1995. The book was officially published on November 4, 2014, to commemorate Deleuze's death.

An itinerant traveler, Jeppesen made his first visit to North Korea in 2012. Between 2012 and 2017, Jeppesen made five visits to North Korea, and was one of the last Americans to visit before the United States instituted a travel ban to the country. Jeppesen wrote a non-fiction novel based on his experiences, See You Again in Pyongyang, which was published in 2018. He has also written about North Korea for the New York Times, Wall Street Journal, New York Daily News, Artforum, and Art in America.

He has taught as a visiting tutor in the art department at Goldsmiths University and as a visiting lecturer in Critical Writing in Art and Design at the Royal College of Art, where he completed his PhD in 2016. His PhD thesis, ‘’Towards a 21st Century Expressionist Art Criticism’’, took an activist approach to its subject, arguing for a return to art criticism’s roots as an essentially creative, literary discipline. A revised version of the thesis was later published in the form of a collection of essays and “ficto-criticism,” Bad Writing. In 2019, he moved to Shanghai, where he taught at the Institute for Cultural and Creative Industry at Shanghai Jiaotong University. In 2022, Jeppesen announced his resignation from his academic post, following the harsh measures of the Covid-19 lockdown in Shanghai as well as an increasing amount of censorship and lack of civic and academic freedoms in China.

Novels
 Victims (2003, Akashic;  / 2015, ITNA)
 Wolf at the Door (2007, Twisted Spoon) 
 The Suiciders (2013, Semiotext(e))
 All Fall: Two Novellas (2014, Publication Studio)

Poetry
 Poems I Wrote While Watching TV (2006, BLATT Books) 
 Dicklung & Others (2009, BLATT Books)

Graphic novels
 Siilky's Room: Outside an anthology of new horror fiction. With art by Winston Chimielinski (2017)

Nonfiction
 Disorientations: Art on the Margins of the Contemporary (2008, Social Disease)
 See You Again in Pyongyang (2018, Hachette)
 Bad Writing (2019, Sternberg)

Disorientations was named Nonfiction Book of the Year by 3am Magazine.

Object-oriented writing
 16 Sculptures (2014, Publication Studio)

Solo exhibitions
 Travis Jeppesen: Word (Rupert, Vilnius, 2016)
 Travis Jeppesen: New Writing (Exile, Berlin, 2016)
 Travis Jeppesen: 16 Sculptures (Wilkinson Gallery, London, 2014)

Group exhibitions
  Down Where Changed (Cubitt, London, 2014-2015)
  Cucumber Bones (Toves, Copenhagen, 2014)
  Whitney Biennial (Whitney Museum of American Art, New York, 2014)
  House Style (Tramway, Glasgow, 2013)

References

External links 
disorientations website
Travis Jeppesen on Substack

21st-century American novelists
American art critics
Living people
The New School alumni
21st-century American poets
American male novelists
American male poets
21st-century American male writers
21st-century American non-fiction writers
American male non-fiction writers
Year of birth missing (living people)